The New School is the debut studio album by Swedish indie pop duo The Tough Alliance. The album was released on 20 April 2005 on the Swedish label Service.

Track listing

Charts

References

External links
The Tough Alliance Homepage 
Service

2005 debut albums
The Tough Alliance albums
Service (record label) albums